Tyungur (Tüñür) is a rural locality (a selo) in Katandinskoye Rural Settlement of Ust-Koksinsky District, the Altai Republic, Russia. The population was 348 as of 2016. There are 12 streets.

Geography 
Tyungur is located on the left bank of the Katun River, 60 km southeast of Ust-Koksa (the district's administrative centre) by road. Kucherla is the nearest rural locality.

References 

Rural localities in Ust-Koksinsky District